Restrepia iris, commonly called the rainbow restrepia, is a species of orchid endemic to southeastern Ecuador.

References

External links 

iris
Endemic orchids of Ecuador
Plants described in 1980